Nordlander is predominantly Swedish personal name assumed by the family of Nordlander, as well as with other people.

Families 
 Nordlander from Bjärtrå

Other people
Axel Nordlander (1879–1962), Swedish officer and equestrian
Bert-Ola Nordlander (born 1938), Swedish ice hockey player
Kristina Persson-Nordlander (born 1969), Swedish Olympic archer
Inger Nordlander (born 1938), Swedish politician
Mats Nordlander (born 1963), Swedish Olympic archer, husband of Kristina
Maud Nordlander (born 1943), Swedish curler

Swedish-language surnames